St Vincent Highway (route B88) is a major road on the southern part of Yorke Peninsula in South Australia. It diverges from Yorke Highway to continue south along the coast of Gulf St Vincent (where Yorke Highway turns inland) near Pine Point. It passes inland of Port Vincent, Stansbury, Wool Bay and Port Giles then passes through Coobowie and Edithburgh. From here, the St Vincent Highway turns northwest to Yorketown and west to Warooka where it rejoins Yorke Highway.

Rex Minerals propose to realign the northern end of the current St Vincent Highway closer to the coast, and move the intersection with the Yorke Highway closer to Pine Point as part of the construction of the Hillside mine.

Major intersections
St Vincent Highway is entirely contained within the Yorke Peninsula Council local government area.

References

Yorke Peninsula
Highways in South Australia